Alessandro Hämmerle (born 30 July 1993) is a Swiss-born Austrian snowboarder, and Olympic gold medalist in the snowboard cross.

Hämmerle competed at the 2014 Winter Olympics for Austria. In the snowboard cross, he finished 2nd in his 1/8 round race, advancing to the quarter-finals, where he placed 5th, not advancing, and ending up 17th overall.

As of September 2014, his best showing at the World Championships was 6th, in the 2013 snowboard cross.

Hämmerle made his World Cup debut in December 2010. As of September 2014, he had one World Cup victory, coming at Sochi in 2012–13. His best overall finish was 4th in 2012–13.

He won the gold medal in snowboard cross at the 2022 Winter Olympics.

World Cup podiums

References

External links

1993 births
Living people
Olympic snowboarders of Austria
Snowboarders at the 2014 Winter Olympics
Snowboarders at the 2018 Winter Olympics
Snowboarders at the 2022 Winter Olympics
Medalists at the 2022 Winter Olympics
Olympic medalists in snowboarding
Olympic gold medalists for Austria
People from Frauenfeld
Austrian male snowboarders
Universiade medalists in snowboarding
Swiss people of Austrian descent
Universiade silver medalists for Austria
Competitors at the 2015 Winter Universiade
X Games athletes